Elmer "Pha" Terrell (May 25, 1910 in Kansas City, Missouri - October 14, 1945 in Los Angeles) was an American jazz singer.

Terrell was working in nightclubs locally in Kansas City in the early 1930s as a singer, dancer, and emcee when he was discovered by Andy Kirk, who hired him to be the vocalist for his group the Twelve Clouds of Joy. Terrell sang with Kirk for eight years, from 1933 to 1941, and recorded with him extensively for Decca Records, singing hits such as 1936's "Until the Real Thing Comes Along" and 1938's "I Won't Tell a Soul (I Love You)".

After 1941 Terrell moved to Indianapolis to play with Clarence Love's territory band, then moved to Los Angeles, where he worked as a soloist. Terrell died of kidney failure in 1945.

References
[no author given]. "Pha Terrell". In Kernfeld, Barry. The New Grove Dictionary of Jazz, 2nd edition. Oxford, 2001.
Chadbourne, Eugene. Pha Terrell biography, Allmusic.com.

1910 births
1945 deaths
American jazz singers
Singers from Missouri
Deaths from kidney failure
20th-century American singers
Jazz musicians from Missouri